Greatest Hits & Videos is a greatest hits album by Huey Lewis and the News, released on May 23, 2006. It contains the band's most popular songs and music videos. The compilation is a follow-up to the band's previous greatest hits compilation, Time Flies... The Best of Huey Lewis & the News from the previous decade.

A version without the DVD was released as Greatest Hits with different cover artwork.

Track listing

CD
"The Heart of Rock & Roll" (Johnny Colla, Huey Lewis)
"I Want a New Drug" (Chris Hayes, Lewis)
"The Power of Love" (from the Back to the Future soundtrack) (Hayes, Lewis, Colla)
"Jacob's Ladder" (Bruce Hornsby, John Hornsby)
"Stuck with You" (Hayes, Lewis)
"Doing It All for My Baby" (Mike Duke, Phil Cody)
"If This Is It" (Colla, Lewis)
"Do You Believe in Love" (Robert John "Mutt" Lange)
"Heart and Soul" (Mike Chapman, Nicky Chinn)
"Back in Time" (from the Back to the Future soundtrack) (Colla, Hayes, Sean Hopper, Lewis)
"Perfect World" (Alex Call)
"I Know What I Like" (Hayes, Lewis)
"Trouble in Paradise" (from the We Are the World album - live in San Francisco 2/21/85) (Colla, Bill Gibson, Hayes, Hopper, Lewis, Mario Cipollina)
"It's Alright" (from the Curtis Mayfield tribute album People Get Ready) (Mayfield)
"Cruisin'" (Huey Lewis duet with Gwyneth Paltrow, from the Duets soundtrack) (Smokey Robinson, Marv Tarplin)
"Hope You Love Me Like You Say You Do" (Duke)
"Small World" (featuring Stan Getz) (Hayes, Lewis)
"But It's Alright" (J.J. Jackson, Pierre Tubbs)
"Hip to Be Square" (Gibson, Hopper, Lewis)
"Couple Days Off" (Hayes, Lewis, Geoffrey Palmer)
"Workin' for a Livin'" (Hayes, Lewis)

DVD
"Do You Believe in Love" (previously unreleased)
"Heart and Soul"
"I Want a New Drug"
"The Heart of Rock & Roll"
"If This Is It"
"Bad Is Bad"
"The Power of Love"
"Stuck with You"
"Doing It All for My Baby" (original long version)
"Workin' for a Livin'" (live at the Country Club, Reseda, CA, 4/29/82)

Charts

Certifications

References

2006 greatest hits albums
Huey Lewis and the News albums
2006 video albums
Music video compilation albums
Capitol Records compilation albums